Kārlis Lejnieks (born March 16, 1988) is a retired Latvian tennis player, who now pursues an interest in coaching. Through his career Lejnieks has won one Futures doubles title and has one runner-up in singles.

Lejnieks made his ATP debut in 2008 St. Petersburg Open where he defeated Russian Alexandre Kudryavtsev in the first round. In the second round he lost to Nr.3 seed Fernando Verdasco. After the tournament he reached a career-high 347 position in the ATP rating. 
He retired at the age of 23 years on June 27, 2011, stating that lack of motivation and previous injuries forced him to do so.

From 2006 to 2011 he played in the Latvian Davis Cup team.

Career Finals

Singles

Wins

Runners-up

Doubles

Wins

References

External links
 
 
 
 Lejnieks world ranking history

1988 births
Living people
Latvian male tennis players